Maxim Igorevich Gratchev (born 26 September 1988) is a Russian former professional ice hockey player who last played for HC Sibir Novosibirsk in the Kontinental Hockey League (KHL). He was selected by New York Islanders in the 4th round (106th overall) of the 2007 NHL Entry Draft. He played for HC Severstal of the KHL for one season, before singing with the Binghamton Senators before the 2011–12 season.

Gratchev confirmed the end of his playing career, in accepting a coaching role with HC Lada Togliatti of the then VHL on April 30, 2014.

References

External links

1988 births
Living people
Binghamton Senators players
Bridgeport Sound Tigers players
Chicago Express players
Elmira Jackals (ECHL) players
HC Lada Togliatti players
Lewiston Maineiacs players
New York Islanders draft picks
Quebec Remparts players
Rimouski Océanic players
Rochester Americans players
Russian ice hockey left wingers
Severstal Cherepovets players
HC Sibir Novosibirsk players
Sportspeople from Novosibirsk